Gurpreet Bedi (born 22 September) is an Indian actress. She was in the top 10 finalists in Pantaloons Femina Miss India and was crowned the Himalayan Femina Miss Natural Beauty. She is best known for her character 'Reeva' in Sony Television's Dil Hi Toh Hai.

Early life 
Gurpreet was born in New Delhi. Shortly after finishing her graduation in graphic designing from University of Bedfordshire, she returned to India.  She is currently residing in Mumbai.

Personal life 
Gurpreet is married to fellow actor Kapil Arya.

Career

Modelling career 
Gurpreet started her modelling career by contesting in Pantaloons Femina Miss India and was one of the top 10 finalists. She continued to appear in various print and online advertisements, TV commercials for brands like Hyundai i20, Whisper, Sunsilk, Garnier, Loreal and many more. She has shot for various magazines like Grazia, Femina, Raymonds and many more. She also hosted the Hockey India League.

Film debut 
In the year 2015, she made her acting debut in Life Ok's Laut Aao Trisha playing the character Suhana (VK's Boss). This was followed by her role in SuperCops vs Supervillains where she played multiple episodes in different characters such as Damyanti (Aghor's Mistress) / Rani Zaffara / SuperCop Hetonwita.

2018 onwards, she played the character of Reeva Noon in web series Dil Hi Toh Hai produced by Ekta Kapoor and originally airing on Sony Entertainment Television.

In 2021, she played the character of Monisha in Bang Baang produced by Ekta Kapoor. This was followed by her role as Sana Shaikh in ZEE5's Qubool Hai 2.0 co-starring Karan Singh Grover & Surbhi Jyoti.

In 2022, She played Character of Maya in Kathmandu Connection 2 followed by her character Keerti Sachdev in Pyar Ke Saat Vachan Dharampatnii

Music video 
She played the character Mitali in a musical web series project The Socho Project.

Filmography

Television shows

Web series

Music videos

References

External links 

 Gurpreet Bedi Presenting the hockey India league
ALTBalaji's new daily show ‘Dil Hi Toh Hai’ streaming now
Dil hi toh hai cast attends Krishna & Pragya's wedding
ALTBalaji Reveals Release Date of the Final Episodes of ‘Dil Hi Toh Hain 3’
Qubool Hai 2.0 Review
With A Gripping Storyline, An #EternalLove And A Cross-Border Drama



21st-century Indian actresses
Indian television actresses
Indian soap opera actresses
Actresses in Hindi television
Indian female models
Year of birth missing (living people)
Living people